Nansenia may refer to:

Nansenia (fish) - a genus of bony fish
853 Nansenia - a minor planet of the Sun system